André Ptaszynski (7 May 1953 – 29 July 2020) was a British theatre and television producer. He was Chief Executive of the Really Useful Group from 2005 to 2011 and Chief Executive of Really Useful Theatres from 2000 to 2005.

Early life and education
He was born in Ipswich to Władysław Ptaszynski, a Polish officer who was released from a prisoner of war camp in Russia, and Joan Holmes, his father's English teacher. He studied English at Jesus College, Oxford.

Career
He was one of the lead producers of the Danny Rubin/Tim Minchin musical Groundhog Day opening at the Old Vic in London in summer 2016 before transferring to Broadway and President and Head of Programming for Andrew Lloyd Webber's West End theatre group which includes the London Palladium and the Theatre Royal Drury Lane. Additionally he was Executive Producer worldwide for the RSC's record-breaking Matilda the Musical, currently running in London, New York, on tour in the US and in Australia.  He Exec. Produced the innovative and one-off live ITV television broadcast production of The Sound of Music for Christmas in December 2015.

He was Chief Executive of the Really Useful Group from 2005 to 2011 and Chief Executive of Really Useful Theatres from 2000 to 2005. During that time he also produced a new production of Evita, directed by Michael Grandage and Love Never Dies, the sequel to The Phantom of the Opera, directed by Jack O'Brien. He was executive producer on Bombay Dreams and the Madness musical, Our House. During Ptaszynski's tenure at the Really Useful Group, the company utilised television talent shows such as How Do You Solve a Problem like Maria? and Any Dream Will Do to cast for the lead roles in some of their most popular musicals. He was also one of the producers of Priscilla, Queen of the Desert in London.

Prior to 2000, he ran his own theatre and TV production company. Amongst other shows, he was sole or co-producer on five which won Best Musical Olivier Awards and/or Evening Standard Awards in the 1990s: Return to the Forbidden Planet, Show Boat, Tommy, Chicago, and Spend Spend Spend. He also promoted many comedians, ranging from Rowan Atkinson, Dave Allen, Rik Mayall and Victoria Wood in the 1980s to Eddie Izzard, The League of Gentlemen and Armstrong and Miller in the 1990s and later.

He produced four BBC television series with Pola Jones. The first was Tygo Road, starring Kevin McNally, which lasted six episodes in 1990.  The veteran sitcom director Bob Spiers introduced Ptaszynski to writer Steven Moffat suggesting that Moffat should write a sitcom. Moffat pitched an idea about a sitcom set in a school, but as the writer was talking passionately about his divorce, Ptaszynski convinced him to write about that instead. The show became Joking Apart which Ptaszynski produced for Pola Jones and which ran for two series and won the Bronze Rose at the Montreux Television Festival in 1995. Like Tygo Road, the show was developed from the Comic Asides series of pilots.  The producer contributed to the DVD audio commentary for the second series.

Moffat’s proposal of a school sitcom was resurrected for Ptaszynski’s next television project after the second series of Joking Apart was broadcast. Two series of Chalk were transmitted on BBC One in 1997.  The producer contributed to the documentary about the show, After the Chalk Dust Settled, included on the DVD release of the first series. During this period, Moffat began a relationship with television producer Sue Vertue, ending the Moffat-Ptaszynski collaboration.

His final television projects for Pola Jones were the sketch/variety The Lenny Beige Television Show and a Saturday Night BBC1 series with Ainsley Harriott, The Hidden Camera Show.

He was a president of the Society of London Theatre and was on the board of the Royal National Theatre from 2001 to 2010.  He continued to sit on the National Theatre (commercial) Productions board.

Personal life
He married Judith Terry in 1985, and their children were Anna, Jamie, Rebecca and Charlie. He died on 29 July 2020, at the age of 67.

References

1953 births
2020 deaths
English television producers
English theatre managers and producers
Alumni of Jesus College, Oxford